The following is a list of state highways in the U.S. state of Louisiana designated in the 450-499 range.


Louisiana Highway 450

Louisiana Highway 451

Louisiana Highway 452

Louisiana Highway 453

Louisiana Highway 454

Louisiana Highway 454 (LA 454) runs  in a general east–west direction from LA 107 at Cedar Grove, Rapides Parish to LA 107 and LA 115 in Effie, Avoyelles Parish.

LA 454 initially heads southeast from LA 107 (Old Marksville Highway) in Cedar Grove toward the Red River.  After passing through an area known as Ruby, the route curves to the east and crosses from Rapides Parish into Avoyelles Parish.  LA 454 then loops back to the northeast to a terminus at the concurrent LA 107 and LA 115 in Effie.

Louisiana Highway 456

Louisiana Highway 456 (LA 456) runs  in a north–south direction from US 71 at Loyd to LA 470 at Lamourie, Rapides Parish.

The entire route closely parallels US 71 (largely co-signed with US 167), running on the opposite side of the Union Pacific Railroad tracks through Meeker and Lecompte to Lamourie.  In Lecompte, an intersection with LA 112 (Wall Street) connects to nearby I-49.  LA 456 served as the original alignment of US 71 and its predecessor, the Jefferson Highway auto trail.  It is an undivided two-lane highway for its entire length.

Louisiana Highway 457

Louisiana Highway 458

Louisiana Highway 459

Louisiana Highway 460

Louisiana Highway 460 (LA 460) runs  in an east–west direction from LA 127 in Nebo to a junction with US 84 and LA 8 at Whitehall, La Salle Parish.

Louisiana Highway 461

Louisiana Highway 462

Louisiana Highway 463

Louisiana Highway 464

Louisiana Highway 465

Louisiana Highway 466

Louisiana Highway 466 (LA 466) runs  in an east–west direction along 5th and Kepler Streets in Gretna from LA 18 (Lafayette Street) to LA 23 (Franklin Avenue).  It is an undivided two-lane highway for its entire length. As of 2019, it is under agreement to be removed from the state highway system and transferred to local control.

LA 466 originally consisted of 16 hyphenated routes designated in the 1955 Louisiana Highway renumbering.  All were located within Gretna, unless otherwise noted:
LA 466-1 (3.2 miles): Patterson Drive, Algiers (Orleans Parish) from LA 428 (General Meyer Avenue) near the Algiers Canal to Merrill Street; part of pre-1955 State Route 996.
LA 466-2 (1.1 miles): Monroe Street from Kepler Street to the Orleans Parish line; part of pre-1955 State Route 30-D.
LA 466-3 (0.9 miles): 1st Street from Huey P. Long Avenue to Weidman Street; pre-1955 State Route 2-D and later State Route 2084.
LA 466-4 (0.4 miles): Weidman Street from Washington Street to Hancock Street; pre-1955 State Route 1241.
LA 466-5 (0.4 miles): Virgil Street from Hamilton Street to Hancock Street; pre-1955 State Route 1240.
LA 466-6 (1.0 mile): Madison Street from Virgil Street to the Orleans Parish line; pre-1955 State Route 1242.
LA 466-7 (1.1 miles): Hancock Street from Kepler Street in Gretna to Socrates Street in Algiers; pre-1955 State Route 30-E. (Removed 1961)
LA 466-8 (1.3 miles): Hamilton Street from Washington Street to Whitney Avenue; pre-1955 State Route 1239. (Removed 1962)
LA 466-9 (0.3 miles): 2nd Street from Huey P. Long Avenue to Lafayette Street; part of pre-1955 State Route C-1474.
LA 466-10 (0.9 miles): 5th and Kepler Streets from Lafayette Street to Hancock Street; part of pre-1955 State Routes 30-D and 30-E. (Removed 1972)
LA 466-11 (0.4 miles): Lavoisier Street from 7th Street to 1st Street; pre-1955 State Route 1237.
LA 466-12 (0.6 miles): Newton Street from 11th Street to 1st Street; pre-1955 State Route 1238.
LA 466-13 (0.3 miles): Huey P. Long Avenue from 10th Street to 5th Street; pre-1955 State Route 451.
LA 466-14 (0.9 miles): Derbigny Street from 14th Street to 1st Street; pre-1955 State Route 456.
LA 466-15 (0.6 miles): Dolhonde Street from 11th Street to 1st Street; pre-1955 State Route 1236.
LA 466-16 (0.2 miles): Lafayette Street from 5th Street to 2nd Street; part of pre-1955 State Route C-1474.

All of the above routes were deleted with the exception of LA 466-10, which was shortened by one block on the east end and renumbered to simply LA 466.

Louisiana Highway 467

Louisiana Highway 468

Louisiana Highway 469

Louisiana Highway 470

Louisiana Highway 471

Louisiana Highway 471 (LA 471) runs  in a north–south direction from US 71 north of Colfax, Grant Parish to LA 34 west of Atlanta, Winn Parish.

The route heads north from US 71, traveling through timber lands and hills. After turning back to the north, LA 471 crosses from Grant Parish into Winn Parish, where it continues to an intersection with LA 34 just outside Atlanta. LA 471 is an undivided two-lane highway for its entire length.

Before the 1955 renumbering, LA 471 was a small part of State Route 5, which was followed by the original alignment of US 167.

Louisiana Highway 472

Louisiana Highway 472 (LA 472) runs  in a north–south direction from US 167 at Williana, Grant Parish to a second junction with US 167 southeast of Winnfield, Winn Parish.  Despite its physical direction, LA 472 is signed east–west.

LA 472 heads northeast from US 167 through the Kisatchie National Forest in Grant Parish and makes a jog at LA 500. The route then proceeds due north and crosses into Winn Parish.

LA 472 is an undivided two-lane highway for its entire length.  Before the 1955 Louisiana Highway renumbering, LA 472 was designated as State Route 232.

Louisiana Highway 473

Louisiana Highway 474

Louisiana Highway 475

Louisiana Highway 476

Louisiana Highway 477

Louisiana Highway 478

Louisiana Highway 478 (LA 478) runs  in a southwest to northeast direction from a junction with two parish roads at Vowells Mill to LA 1 in Natchitoches.  It is located entirely within Natchitoches Parish.

LA 478 heads east from Vowells Mill through the Kisatchie National Forest. It crosses both LA 117 and LA 120 before passing through an interchange with I-49 at Exit 132 just inside the Natchitoches city limits. (The route is co-signed with Natchitoches Parish Route 620 in this vicinity). LA 478 is an undivided two-lane highway for its entire length.

Before the 1955 Louisiana Highway renumbering, LA 478 was signed as State Route 609 from Vowels Mill to LA 117 and as State Route 432 for the remainder of the route.

Louisiana Highway 479

Louisiana Highway 480

Louisiana Highway 481

Louisiana Highway 482

Louisiana Highway 483

Louisiana Highway 483 (LA 483) runs  in a north–south direction from US 171 in Noble, Sabine Parish to LA 175 in Pelican, DeSoto Parish.

The route heads northeast from US 171 in Noble and curves due north at Sardis.  Reaching Oak Grove, a point east of Converse, LA 483 turns east in a brief concurrency with LA 174 before resuming its northward course at Mitchell.  It proceeds in a general northeast direction and encounters a series of curves as it crosses from Sabine Parish into DeSoto Parish.  Soon after crossing the parish line, LA 483 heads due north again and intersects LA 512.  It immediately curves northeast into the small community of Pelican where it intersects LA 513.  LA 483 proceeds a short distance to its terminus at LA 175 on the east side of town.  It is an undivided two-lane highway for its length.

Louisiana Highway 484

Louisiana Highway 485

Louisiana Highway 486

Louisiana Highway 487

Louisiana Highway 488

Louisiana Highway 489

Louisiana Highway 490

Louisiana Highway 490 (LA 490) runs  in a general east–west direction from a local road in Janie to the Red River east of Marco, Natchitoches Parish.

LA 490 is an undivided, surfaced two-lane highway that continues the path of a dirt local road northeast through Janie. In Chopin, the highway passes through a diamond interchange with I-49 (exit 113) and crosses the Union Pacific Railroad line at grade. It then passes the entrance to the Martco lumber factory and crosses over the Cane River. LA 490 turns northeast off of LA 1 and winds through Galbraith and Marco, intersecting LA 3279 between those points. At the end of its route, LA 490 provides access to, and makes a loop in front of, the Red River Lock & Dam #3.

For a time, LA 490 resumed on the opposite bank of the Red River in Colfax, following Faircloth and 2nd Streets to a junction with LA 8.  A spur continued along Faircloth Street past 2nd Street to a junction with LA 158.  Prior to the 1930s, the two segments of LA 490 were connected by the West End Ferry.  During this time, LA 490 was designated as State Route 431 in the original state highway system, which was in use from 1921 to 1955.

Louisiana Highway 491

Louisiana Highway 492

Louisiana Highway 492 (LA 492) runs  in an east–west direction from LA 8 south of Colfax to US 71 at Bagdad, Grant Parish.

A rural route connecting US 71 and LA 8 south of Colfax, LA 492 served as the original alignment of both US 71 and its predecessor, the Jefferson Highway auto trail.  It is an undivided two-lane highway for its length.

Louisiana Highway 493

Louisiana Highway 494

Louisiana Highway 495

Louisiana Highway 496

Louisiana Highway 496 (LA 496) runs  in an east–west direction from LA 121 at McNutt to a junction with US 71, US 165, and LA 28 in Alexandria, Rapides Parish.

Louisiana Highway 497

Louisiana Highway 498

Louisiana Highway 499

References

External links
La DOTD State, District, and Parish Maps